The 2014 GoPro Indy Grand Prix of Sonoma was a Verizon IndyCar Series event that was held on August 24, 2014 at Sonoma Raceway in Sonoma, California. It was the seventeenth and penultimate race of the 2014 IndyCar Series season. The eighty-five lap race was won by Scott Dixon for Chip Ganassi Racing, Ryan Hunter-Reay finished second and Simon Pagenaud third. A 6.0 earthquake hit the area in the early morning of the race; it did not damage the track, and officials deemed its infrastructure safe from collapse, allowing the race to proceed as scheduled.

The win was the 35th of Dixon's career, tying him with Bobby Unser for the fifth-most of all-time. Will Power maintained his lead in the series championship points standings after taking pole position in qualifying and scoring a ninth-place finish, building a 51-point advantage over his Team Penske teammate Hélio Castroneves.

As of the 2022 IndyCar Series, this was the last race of Mike Conway's IndyCar career. That season he was sharing a car with Ed Carpenter, who was doing the ovals. Carpenter would do the final race of the season at Fontana. After this, Conway would go off to the World Endurance Championship, where he would race for Toyota.

References

GoPro Indy Grand Prix of Sonoma
Indy Grand Prix of Sonoma
GoPro Indy Grand Prix of Sonoma
GoPro Indy Grand Prix of Sonoma